Aurum is a sweet Italian liqueur produced in Pescara since 1925.  It is 40% alcohol by volume and it is made from brandy and citrus fruit infusion.
It goes well with sweets, especially with parrozzo, another specialty of Pescara. Other than as a drink, it is often used as a cake ingredient or as an addition to ice-cream.

The name of this liqueur was chosen by Amedeo Pomilio, the founder of the Aurum factory, upon suggestion by the poet and writer Gabriele D'Annunzio, with a reference to the ancient Roman origins of the recipe. The name derives from the pun between the Latin words aurum, which means gold, and aurantium, which means orange (fruit).

References

Fruit liqueurs
Citrus liqueurs
Italian liqueurs
Cuisine of Abruzzo
Products introduced in 1925